Tauriphila argo, the arch-tipped glider, is a species of skimmer in the dragonfly family Libellulidae. It is found in South America.

The IUCN conservation status of Tauriphila argo is "LC", least concern, with no immediate threat to the species' survival. The population is stable. The IUCN status was reviewed in 2017.

References

Further reading

 

Libellulidae
Articles created by Qbugbot
Insects described in 1869